Paula Cwikly is an American soap opera writer for the Daytime television serial The Young and the Restless. She was NBC Daytime's director of daytime programming.

She is a 1982 graduate of the University of Dayton.

Career
As the World Turns
Associate Head Writer: Fall 2003 - March 2, 2005, August 5, 2005 - January 6, 2006

Days of Our Lives
Co-Head Writer: March 29, 2002 - March 6, 2003
Associate Head Writer: 2000 - March 28, 2002, March 6, 2003 - September 3, 2003

Sunset Beach
Writer: 1998 - 1999

The Young and the Restless
Breakdown Writer: January 4, 2008 – 2012
Associate Head Writer: August 7, 2006 - August 3, 2007

Awards and nominations
Daytime Emmy Awards 
Nominated for Best Writing; As The World Turns, 2004-06
Winner for Best Writing; As The World Turns, 2005
Writers Guild of America Award 
Nomination for 2006 Season, The Young And The Restless); 2005 Season; As The World Turns; 2001 Season; Days of our Lives

References

External links
 

American soap opera writers
American screenwriters
Daytime Emmy Award winners
Year of birth missing (living people)
Living people
American women television writers
American women screenwriters
Women soap opera writers
21st-century American women